James Huff Stout (September 25, 1848 – December 8, 1910) was an American Republican politician and businessman from Wisconsin.

Biography
Born in Dubuque, Iowa, Stout became involved with his father's lumber business. After working in the District of Columbia and Read's Landing, Minnesota, Stout settled in Menomonie, Wisconsin. From 1895 to 1910, he served in the Wisconsin State Senate. While in the Wisconsin Senate he worked in opening libraries and improving highways. He also started a manual school in Menomonie, Wisconsin that became the University of Wisconsin–Stout.

Notes

Politicians from Dubuque, Iowa
People from Wabasha County, Minnesota
People from Menomonie, Wisconsin
Businesspeople from Wisconsin
Republican Party Wisconsin state senators
University of Wisconsin–Stout people
1848 births
1910 deaths
19th-century American politicians
19th-century American businesspeople